Revenge on the Brother (Persian title: Enteghm-e baradar- )  is a 1931 Iranian silent drama film directed by Ebrahim Moradi, and starring Abdolhossein Lojasti, Reza Shahabi, Ahmad Moradi, Kazem Poor Hassan and Lida Matavesian.

References

1931 films
Iranian silent films
1931 drama films
Iranian black-and-white films
Iranian drama films
Silent drama films